Konstantinos Volanakis (Greek: Κωνσταντίνος Βολανάκης; 1837 - 29 June 1907) was a Greek painter who became known as the "father of Greek seascape painting".

Biography 

Volanakis was born at Heraklion on Crete, to parents who came from a small village near Rethymno. Later, they moved again for business reasons, and he completed his basic education on Syros in 1856. Afterward, urged on by his brothers, he went to Trieste and became a book-keeping clerk for a family of Greek merchants who were related to his family by marriage. While there, he made sketches of ships and harbors in his account books. Rather than dismiss him, the family recognized his artistic talent, and made arrangements for him to study at the Academy of Fine Arts, Munich, under Karl von Piloty, joining a group of Greek students that included Nikolaos Gyzis, Georgios Jakobides, Nikiphoros Lytras and Polychronis Lembesis. His instructors discouraged any sort of landscape painting, because it was "in decline", so he concentrated on portraits. 

His break came in 1869, three years after the Battle of Lissa, when Emperor Franz Joseph held a drawing competition to memorialize the event. Volanakis won the contest, receiving 1000 gold Florins and free travel cruises with the Austrian navy for three years. He took full advantage of this, producing numerous canvases and sketches. In 1883, despite warnings from Gyzis that it would ruin his career, he returned to Greece and settled in Piraeus, where his family had a pottery factory, citing pressure from his wife, whose health was suffering from the cold winters in Germany.

From then until 1903, he was a teacher at the Athens School of Fine Arts, where one of his best-known students was Michalis Oikonomou. He also operated his own private school. Another of his pupils was Sophia Laskaridou In 1889, he was awarded the Silver Cross of the Order of the Redeemer. He was, however, very poor in his later years, due to his very large family and declining interest in his art. In an effort to increase his income, he reversed the usual method of painting first, then framing, by working with a group of framers who would make luxurious carved frames first, then creating paintings to fit them.

Volanakis died on 29 June 1907 at Piraeus, from complications related to a major hernia. His funeral fell on an important election day, so very few people attended. Most of his works are in private collections.

Gallery

References

External links
ArtNet: More works by Volanakis

Artists from Heraklion
1837 births
1907 deaths
Academy of Fine Arts, Munich alumni
19th-century Greek painters
Munich School
Academic staff of the Athens School of Fine Arts